Dintesheim is an Ortsgemeinde – a municipality belonging to a Verbandsgemeinde, a kind of collective municipality – in the Alzey-Worms district in Rhineland-Palatinate, Germany.

Geography 

As a winegrowing centre, Dintesheim lies in Germany's biggest winegrowing district, in the middle of Rhenish Hesse. It belongs to the Verbandsgemeinde of Alzey-Land, whose seat is in Alzey.

Politics 

The council is made up of 6 council members, who are elected by majority vote, with the honorary mayor as chairman.

The last municipal election was held on 7 June 2009.

References

External links 
Dintesheim in the collective municipality’s Web pages 
Report on the Südwestrundfunk (SWR) programme Hierzuland from 10 July 2004 

Rhenish Hesse
Alzey-Worms